Cromer Windmill may refer to a number of windmills:-

In Hertfordshire
Cromer Windmill, Ardeley

In Norfolk
Any of three windmills at Cromer